A jar opener is a kitchen device which is used to open glass jars. 
A jar is sealed by either (a) a screw-off rubberised lid or (b) a lid placed on the opening of the jar with a rubber sealing-ring between. Screw-off lids are usually made of metal with a thin rubber sealing layer, the lift-off lids mostly consist of glass.

Opener for screw-off lids
A traditional jar opener for a screw-off lid will have two handles, leading up to two concentric grooved rings which can be used to fit different lids. It also sometimes has a device to open a bottle on it. There are many new models including rubber sheet grip models and rubber timing belt loop models.

Opener for lift-off lids
Jar openers that are designed to wedge open a lid sealed by a rubber ring were patented and produced in Germany starting mid 1930s, but all production has halted following the turn of the century. On the right is an example of a wooden vintage jar opener for preserve jars.

Opening jars / Disabilities
Many people can remove the lids of glass jars by hand. Some people with and without disabilities cannot open a jar, while others prefer the ease.

Motorised jar openers
Black & Decker introduced the first automatic jar opener in 2003.

See also 
 Gilhoolie

References

Kitchenware